Emil Kristev is a Bulgarian mixed martial artist.

Mixed martial arts record

|-
| Loss
| align=center| 1-3
| Remigijus Kazaciunas
| TKO
| Rings Lithuania: Bushido Rings 2
| 
| align=center| 0
| align=center| 0:00
| Vilnius, Lithuania
| 
|-
| Win
| align=center| 1-2
| Iouri Bekichev
| Decision (1-0 points)
| Rings Russia: Russia vs. Bulgaria
| 
| align=center| 1
| align=center| 10:00
| Yekaterinburg, Russia
| 
|-
| Loss
| align=center| 0-2
| Mikhail Ilyukhin
| Submission (achilles lock)
| Rings Russia: Russia vs. Bulgaria
| 
| align=center| 1
| align=center| 0:00
| Tula, Russia
| 
|-
| Loss
| align=center| 0-1
| Bob Schrijber
| Submission (guillotine choke)
| Rings Holland: Kings of Martial Arts
| 
| align=center| 1
| align=center| 4:09
| Amsterdam, North Holland, Netherlands
|

See also
List of male mixed martial artists

References

External links
 
 Emil Kristev at mixedmartialarts.com

Bulgarian male mixed martial artists
Living people
Year of birth missing (living people)